The World Moves On is a 1934 American drama film directed by John Ford and starring Madeleine Carroll and Franchot Tone. It was the first Hollywood code approved film.

Plot
The story opens in the year 1825, when two families, cotton merchants in England and America, with branches in France and Prussia swear to stand by each other in a belief that a great business firmly established in four countries will be able to withstand even such another calamity as the Napoleonic Wars from which Europe is slowly recovering. Then many years later, along comes World War I and the years that follow, to test the businesses.

Cast
 Madeleine Carroll as Mrs. Warburton, 1825/Mary Warburton Girard, 1914
 Franchot Tone as Richard Girard
 Reginald Denny as Erik von Gerhardt
 Sig Ruman as Baron von Gerhardt (as Siegfried Rumann)
 Louise Dresser as Baroness von Gerhardt
 Raul Roulien as Carlos Girard (1825) / Henri Girard (1914)
 Stepin Fetchit as Dixie
 Lumsden Hare as Gabriel Warburton (1825) / Sir John Warburton (1914)
 Dudley Digges as Mr. Manning
 Frank Melton as John Girard (1825)
 Brenda Fowler as Madame Agnes Girard (1825)
 Russell Simpson as Notary (1825)
 Walter McGrail as The Duallist (1825)
 Marcelle Corday as Madame Girard II (1914)
 Charles Bastin as Jacques Girard, the Boy (1914)
 Barry Norton as Jacques Girard (1924)
 George Irving as Charles Girard (1914)
 Ferdinand Schumann-Heink as Fritz von Gerhardt
 Georgette Rhodes as Jeanne Girard
 Claude King as Colonel Braithwaite
 Ivan F. Simpson as Clumber (as Ivan Simpson)
 Frank Moran as Sergeant Culbert, Soldier in Trench

Production notes
Most of the World War I battle footage was taken from the 1932 French film Wooden Crosses. This film was the first to receive an MPPDA (now, the MPA) certificate under the new Production Code, and received certificate #1.

Reception
Mordaunt Hall of The New York Times called it "an ambitious undertaking, well composed and photographed, but it does seem as though the film would be all the better if it were shortened." Variety said it was "an impressive picture", although the first half-hour was "undeniably slow." "Impressive in magnitude and well cast", reported Film Daily. John Mosher of The New Yorker panned it as "a completely synthetic affair" that was "padded out to the limit". The Chicago Tribune called it "a moving tale" and "well worth your time", with "but one fault – extreme length."

Awards
John Ford won the Special Recommendation award at the 1934 Venice Film Festival for this film.

References

External links

1934 films
1934 drama films
American drama films
American black-and-white films
Films directed by John Ford
Fox Film films
American World War I films
1930s English-language films
1930s American films